Statistics of L. League in the 1992 season. Yomiuri Nippon SC Ladies Beleza won the championship.

JLSL League Standings

League awards

Best player

Top scorers

Best eleven

Best young player

JLSL Challenge League

Promotion/relegation series

Division 1 promotion/relegation series 

 Shiroki FC Serena Promoted for Division 1 in 1993 Season.
 Tasaki Kobe Ladies Relegated to Division 2 in 1993 Season.

See also 
 Empress's Cup

External links 
  Nadeshiko League Official Site

Nadeshiko League seasons
L
Japan
Japan
1992 in Japanese women's sport